Ulkeus is a genus of clown beetles in the family Histeridae. There are about six described species in Ulkeus.

Species
These six species belong to the genus Ulkeus:
 Ulkeus discrepans (Reichensperger, 1939)
 Ulkeus gratianus (Bruch, 1926)
 Ulkeus henrici (Reichensperger, 1939)
 Ulkeus intricatus Horn, 1885
 Ulkeus pheidoliphilus (Bruch, 1930)
 Ulkeus sahlbergi (Schmidt, 1893)

References

Further reading

 
 

Histeridae
Articles created by Qbugbot